Aisha Ibrahim may refer to:

 Aisha Ibrahim (chef), Filipino-American chef
 Aisha Ibrahim (writer) (born 1969), Libyan novelist